Expedition Robinson 2000, was the second and final season of the Swiss version of the reality show Expedition Robinson, or Survivor as it is referred to in some countries to air in Switzerland and it was broadcast on TV3 from March 12, 2000 to June 11, 2000. An immediate twist that occurred this season was that the contestants were initially split into two tribes based on gender. In episode one, Daniel Sauter suffered an injury at camp and had to be evacuated from the game. Sauter was later replaced by Hansjürg Binzegger. Both Alessandra Angiuli and Manfred Breitschmid were eliminated from the game in episode two when the contestants were split up into two tribes of seven, one being the Nordcamp (North Team) and the other being the Südcamp (South team), based on a school yard style pick. Following a duel in episode four, South Team member Sascha Negele was moved to the North Team. In episode six the two tribes merged into the Tengah tribe and shortly after the fifth tribal council the "black vote" twist was introduced into the game. The black vote twist allowed a player that was voted out at one tribal council to cast a vote at the following tribal council. In episode seven, a joker, Ivana Bolzano, entered the game. When it came time for the final five, the contestants took part in a series of challenges in which the winner would be able to eliminate any of the losers they wanted to. Maddalena Haug, Sascha Negele, and Dayana Zgraggen all failed to win a challenge and were eliminated. Ultimately, it was Stefanie Ledermann who won this season over Martina Pérez with 5-3 jury vote.

Finishing order

Voting history

 As both Andreas and Thomas received five votes at the sixth tribal council, it was up to Martina, as the immunity winner, to decide who would be eliminated.

References

External links
https://web.archive.org/web/20001210124200/http://www.tv3.ch/robinson/stefanie.htm
http://www.robinson-hansjuerg.ch/tagebuch01.htm
http://www.lavatv.com/robinson/htm/frame_robinson.html

Switzerland
2000s reality television series
2000s Swiss television series